János Konrád (27 August 1941 – 26 November 2014) was a Hungarian water polo player and backstroke swimmer who competed in the 1960 Summer Olympics, in the 1964 Summer Olympics, and in the 1968 Summer Olympics.

He was born in Budapest.

Konrád was part of the Hungarian water polo team which won the bronze medal in the 1960 tournament. He played one match and scored one goal. He also participated in the 100 metre backstroke competition but was eliminated in the first round.

Four years later he was a member of the Hungarian team which won the gold medal in the 1964 Olympic tournament. He played all six matches and scored two goals.

At the 1968 Games he won his second bronze medal with the Hungarian team. He played all eight matches and scored three goals. On 26 November 2014 he died at the age of 73.

See also
 Hungary men's Olympic water polo team records and statistics
 List of Olympic champions in men's water polo
 List of Olympic medalists in water polo (men)

References

External links
 

1941 births
2014 deaths
Hungarian male water polo players
Hungarian male swimmers
Male backstroke swimmers
Olympic water polo players of Hungary
Olympic swimmers of Hungary
Water polo players at the 1960 Summer Olympics
Water polo players at the 1964 Summer Olympics
Water polo players at the 1968 Summer Olympics
Swimmers at the 1960 Summer Olympics
Olympic gold medalists for Hungary
Olympic bronze medalists for Hungary
Olympic medalists in water polo
Medalists at the 1968 Summer Olympics
Medalists at the 1964 Summer Olympics
Medalists at the 1960 Summer Olympics
Water polo players from Budapest